The Knock is a British television crime drama, created by Anita Bronson and broadcast on ITV, which portrayed the activities of customs officers from the London City & South Collection Investigation Unit of HM Customs and Excise. The series derived its name from the distinctive "Knock knock knock" command used over the radio to synchronise a raid.

Five series were broadcast from 10 April 1994, until 11 November 2000. 37 episodes were made. The series had a rotating cast, with only a small number of cast members appearing throughout the series' run. The only three cast members to appear in every series were Caroline Lee-Johnson, Trevor Byfield and Steve Toussaint. The series also adopted a number of different formats: while the early series interspersed various storylines and had running plots across the series; later series adopted a multi-part format resulting in two or three cases per series; while the final series adopted a stand-alone week by-week format.

The series was axed in 2001 following poor viewing figures for the final series. This was blamed on the loss of several main cast members, a change in the format and the overall look of the series which changed dramatically following an overhaul by ITV executives in 1999.

Cast

Main cast

Guest cast
 Anthony Valentine as George Webster (Series 1—2)
 Ian Burfield as Tommy Maddern (Series 1—2)
 Oliver Tobias as Allan De Montfort (Series 2)
 Alan Gear as Swedish Sea Captain (Series 2-3)
 John Vine as Jeffrey Faulds (Series 2)
 Lenny McLean as Eddie Davies (Series 2—3)
 Colin Baker as Desmond Dewhurst (Series 3)
 Dennis Waterman as John Danson (Series 3)
 Fiona Dolman as Anna Ransley (Series 3)
 Michael Brandon as Greg Taylor (Series 4)
 Bryan Marshall as Frankie Johnson (Series 4)
 Cherie Lunghi as Toni Maxwell (Series 4)
 Rik Mayall as Simon Reid (Series 5)
 Steve John Shepherd as Rick Foster (Series 5)
  Jay Simon as Jan Lund (series 5)
 Martine McCutcheon as Jenny Foster (Series 5)
 David Threlfall as Barry Connery (Series 5)
 Gillian Taylforth as Anne Gilbraith (Series 5)
 Danny Webb as John Gilbraith (Series 5)

Episodes

Series overview

Series 1 (1994)
The first series consists of seven episodes, and was broadcast from 10 April to 22 May 1994. It was released on DVD on 27 November 2006. The DVD release of the series has become hard to obtain. The series was rebroadcast in Australia for the first time in 2014. This series was repeated on ITV3 on 10 January 2017, 11 January 2017, 12 January 2017, 13 January 2017, 14 January 2017, 17 January 2017 and 18 January 2017.

Series 2 (1996)
The second series consists of thirteen episodes, and was broadcast from 28 April to 21 July 1996. It was released on DVD on 27 August 2007. The DVD release of the series has become hard to obtain. The series was rebroadcast in Australia for the first time in 2014. This series was rebroadcast on ITV3 on 19 January 2017, 20 January 2017, 21 January 2017, 24 January 2017, 25 January 2017, 26 January 2017, 27 January 2017, 28 January 2017, 31 January 2017, 1 February 2017, 2 February 2017, 3 February 2017 and 7 February 2017.

Series 3 (1997)
The third series consists of seven episodes, and was broadcast from 6 April to 18 May 1997. The series has never been released on DVD, and repeats have been very few and far between. This series was rebroadcast on ITV3 on 8 February 2017, 9 February 2017, 10 February 2017, 14 February 2017, 15 February 2017, 16 February 2017 and 17 February 2017.

Series 4 (1999)
The fourth series consists of six episodes, and was broadcast from 7 January to 11 February 1999. This series was the last to feature many of the original cast members, including Enzo Squillino, Jr. and Andrew Dunn; and was also the last series to feature multi-part stories (in this case, two stories of three episodes each). The series has never been released on DVD, and although repeats have been very few and far between, the series was repeated in full from 13–20 June 2016, on ITV3. This Series was rebroadcast on ITV3 on 21 February 2017, 22 February 2017, 23 February 2017, 24 February 2017, 28 February 2017 and 1 March 2017.

Series 5 (2000)
The fifth and final series consists of four episodes, and was broadcast from 21 October to 11 November 2000. This series saw a major overhaul in both the production team and cast; with Caroline Lee-Johnson, Steve Toussaint and Daniel Brown the only three cast members to return. The format of the series was also very different, featuring four stand-alone stories, with the running time extended to 105 minutes per episode, with advertisements. A new theme tune and title sequence was also introduced. The series has never been released on DVD, and although repeats have been very few and far between, the series was repeated in full from 21—24 June 2016 on ITV3. This Series was rebroadcast on ITV3 on 2 March 2017, 3 March 2017, 9 March 2017 and 10 March 2017.

References

External links

1994 British television series debuts
2000 British television series endings
1990s British crime drama television series
2000s British crime drama television series
English-language television shows
ITV television dramas
London Weekend Television shows
Television series by ITV Studios
Television shows set in London